Amber Brown is a family comedy television series based on the book series of the same name by Paula Danziger. It premiered on July 29, 2022 on Apple TV+.

Premise
Amber Brown is a multi-ethnic girl navigating the typical pitfalls of growing up while dealing with the divorce of her parents.

Cast
 Carsyn Rose as Amber Brown
 Sarah Drew as Sarah Brown
 Darin Brooks as Max
 Liliana Inouye as Brandi Colwin
 Michael Yo as Philip
 Ashley Williams as Aunt Pam
 Beau Hart as Stanley
 Joshua Gallup as Justin
 Luma-Marie Katich as Hannah Burton

Episodes

Production
It was announced in September 2021 that Apple TV+ had ordered an adaptation of the Paula Danziger books to the series from Bonnie Hunt who serves as its executive producer. Carsyn Rose was cast in the title role, with Sarah Drew cast as her mother. Michael Yo and Ashley Williams were also revealed as part of the cast, by the cast member Darin Brooks.

Filming for the series took place in Salt Lake City beginning in September 2021.

Release
The series debuted on July 29, 2022.

References

External links

2020s American children's comedy television series
2022 American television series debuts
Apple TV+ children's programming
Apple TV+ original programming
American television shows based on children's books
English-language television shows
Television series about children
Television series by Boat Rocker Media
Television shows filmed in Utah